Margaret L. McLeod  (died June 19, 1993) was the founder of the Cheshire Homes in Canada which provided housing for people with disabilities. Outside of the Cheshire Homes, McLeod was a co-founder of the Ontario Federation for the Physically Handicapped. McLeod was awarded the Order of Canada in 1979 and inducted into the Terry Fox Hall of Fame in 1993.

Career
McLeod began her career in disabilities volunteering as a teacher for the Ontario Crippled Children's Centre. While at the OCCC, she was asked to visit the Cheshire Homes in England which provided housing for adults with disabilities. She was inspired to create Cheshire Homes in Canada based on her experiences with people with disabilities at the OCCC.

McLeod founded the North American base of Cheshire Homes in 1970. The first Canadian Cheshire Home opened was McLeod House in 1972, which was named after her. After the opening of McLeod House, she started the Clarendon Foundation in Toronto and extended her work to other parts of Ontario including Streetsville, Mississauga and Belleville, Ontario. During her time at Cheshire Homes, she was on the developing committee for the organization, and founded over twenty Cheshire Homes. Outside of her work with Cheshire Homes, McLeod co-founded the Ontario Federation for the Physically Handicapped.

Personal life
McLeod was married with three children.

Awards and honours
In 1978, McLeod was awarded with the Ontario Medal for Good Citizenship. The following year, McLeod was honoured with the Order of Canada. In 1993, she was inducted into the Terry Fox Hall of Fame.

Death
McLeod died on June 19, 1993.

References

Year of birth missing
1993 deaths
Members of the Order of Canada
Canadian Disability Hall of Fame
20th-century Canadian women